A list of films produced by the Marathi language film industry based in Maharashtra in the year 1946.

1946 Releases
A list of Marathi films released in 1946.

References

External links
 Gomolo - 

Lists of 1946 films by country or language
1946
1946 in Indian cinema